Karaputugala is a village in Matara District, Sri Lanka, 22 kilometers away from Matara. It is about 4 kilometers from Kamburupitiya.

Location of the school.
ovitigamuwa
Mr/Ovitigamuwa Maha Vidyalaya is situated in Karaputugala village which is 41/2 miles away from Kamburupitiya town in Matara District of Southern Province in Sri Lanka.
For further details www.omv.sch.lk

Populated places in Southern Province, Sri Lanka
Populated places in Matara District